The Devil May Care is the second full-length album by Melbourne-based rock music group 67 Special. The album was released in Australia on Saturday 11 August 2007.

It was recorded at Mangrove Studios in New South Wales with American producer and engineer Jacquire King. The band has said they tried to keep things as simple as possible for this album.

Track listing
 "Sold Your Little Sister for a Red Red Motor Car" – 2:57
 "Killer Bees" – 2:26
 "Lady Gin" – 2:48
 "Shot at the Sun" – 3:29
 "Songbird" – 3:24
 "Patch Me Up" – 4:19
 "So Help Us All" – 3:46
 "Hard Kinda Talk" – 4:03
 "Quickdraw" – 2:42
 "Running From The Man" – 2:37
 "Round & Round" – 3:38
 "It's Not Like You" – 5:57

References

67 Special albums
2007 albums